Swatta is a 2017 Bangladeshi romantic tragedy film. The film directed by Hashibur Reza Kallol and produced by Sohani Hossain under the banner of Taranga Entertainment. It is a story written by Sohani Hossain and a screenplay and dialogue written by Ferdous Hassan. The film features Bangladeshi superstar Shakib Khan and Paoli Dam (in her Bangladeshi debut) in the lead roles and Kabila, Nasrin, Rina Khan, Don and many have played supporting roles in the film.

The principal photography of the film began on November 16, 2014, and wrapped up on November 20, 2016. The first look teaser of the film was revealed on April 14, 2016. The film released on April 7, 2017, in Bangladesh. The film's soundtrack album is composed by Bappa Mazumder, which his first soundtrack composition. It is the second direction of Hashibur Reza Kallol; previously he directed a film titled Andha Nirangam, which is based on the evolution of Lalon's philosophy and consciousness. The film won numerous accolades including five National Film Awards in several categories including Khan's fourth Best Actor award at the 42 National Film Awards, six Bachsas Awards including Khan's third Best Actor award, two Meril-Prothom Alo Awards.

Plot

Cast 
 Shakib Khan as Sobuj, an estranged son of a rich man, whose aunt and uncle turn him into a drug addict and desperate to seize his property
 Paoli Dam as Shikha, a prostitute, who killed a doctor to save her honor and fled to Dhaka and later fell in love with drug addicted Sabuj
 Don as himself, a leader of a terrorist group hired by Sabuj's uncle and aunt to kill him
 Rina Khan as Ranga Mashi (রাঙা মাসি), a woman prostitute businesswoman
 Kabila as himself, Sabuj's friend and collaborator
 Nasreen as Rita, a prostitute, Shikha's friend and collaborator
 Jadu Azad as Akkas, Sabuj's uncle, who along with his wife want desperate to seize Sabuj's property
 Shamima Naznin as Rupa, Shikha's mother
 Shabnam Parvin as Sabuj's aunt, who along her husband want desperate to seize Sabuj's property
 Jayanta Chattopadhyay as Shikha's father
 Shimul Khan as Zahir, a Police official
 Bithi Rani Sarkar - Item number; guest appearance in "Gulistaner Moor" song
 Liza Mitu - Item number; guest appearance in "Raja Bodol" song

Production 
On October 15, 2014, the film Muharat was held at a restaurant in Dhaka.

Casting 
Initially, though the film was supposed to play Ahmed Rubel in the role of Paoli Dam's father, later he was dropped for the role and Jayanta Chattopadhyay was taken for this character after he was not present on time and was not present with the schedule.

Bonna Mirza, who played the role of Rupa as the mother of one of the film's most important character Paoli Dam, after three days of shooting he suddenly felt the urge to return to the stage, and he withdrew from the film. Shamima Nazneen was later selected for this character.

Filming 
Principal photography of the film began on November 16, 2014, at the Jharna spot of BFDC, the lead actors of film Shakib Khan and Paoli Dam took part in the first day of filming. The second lot of filming of the film started on December 26, 2014, in the Pubali of Dhaka. After the shooting of second lot, the film was stopped due to schedule complication of Shakib Khan and Paoli Dam. Subsequently, the third lot of filming was begun on February 24, 2016, in this lot Shaheed Minar, BFDC, Dhaka Cantonment and Gulshan Ladies Park are being filmed for six days. Then, the fourth and final lot of filming was begins on October 15, in Cox's Bazar in Bangladesh. There are two songs and several scenes of the film were filmed for five days leading up to October 20, 2016.

Soundtrack 

The soundtrack of the film was composed by Bappa Mazumder. The film used a total of seven songs, including two item songs. A song from the soundtrack titled "Naa Jani Kon Oporadhe" was recorded on September 19, 2012, in Bappa Mazumdar's own studio, where Momtaz Begum collaborated with him for the first time. Earlier in the same month, he recorded two songs from the soundtrack sung by himself with Dilshad Nahar Kona and Samina Chowdhury titled "Anek Kothar Bhire" and "Ami Toke Chai". And also a song titled "Tor Premete" was recorded on August 3, 2014. On March 23, 2017, the first song of the film "Onek Kothar Vire" was released as a promotional track on Deco's YouTube channel under the banner of Qinetic Network. After that, the second song of the film titled "Naa Jani Kon Oporadhe" was released on March 26, and the song sung by Momtaz Begum, for the song she won the National Film Awards, the Meril Prothom Alo Awards and the Bachsas Awards as the Best Female Singer And also Bappa Mazumder won the National Film Award for the first time as the Best Music Director for the song. The third song of the film titled "Ami Toke Chai" was released on March 28, on the occasion of Shakib Khan's birthday, the song sung by Bappa Mazumder and Samina Chowdhury. Then the fourth song of film titled "Tor Premete Ondho Holam" sung by James and lyrics written by Sohani Hossain was released on March 30, 2017. For the song Sohani Hossain won the Global Music Awards for Best Lyricist in 2018, and James won the National Film Awards, the Meril Prothom Alo Awards and the Bachsas Awards in the Best Male Singer category. The song placed number 1 in the List of the Top 50 songs by ABC Radio in 2017, and it was ranked number 3 on the "Top 10 Bengali Songs Listened to YouTube in 2017" by The Daily Star.

Promotion and released 
The first look teaser of the film was revealed on YouTube on April 14, 2016, on the occasion of Pahela Baishakh. The film was submitted to the censor board on January 12, 2017, and then the film got an uncut certificate from the Bangladesh Film Censor Board on January 31, 2017. Director Hashibur Reza Kallol revealed a drawing poster of the film on his Facebook account on March 5, 2017, which was designed by Aseem Chandra Roy of Kolkata. Following that the official trailer of the film was released on YouTube channel of Khan Films on March 16, 2017. On March 6, 2017, the film's producer and story writer Sohani Hossain organized a special exhibition of the film at the Rupakatha Cinema Hall in Pabna. On April 4, 2017, as a part of film promotion the inaugural exhibition of the film was held at the Star Cineplex in Dhaka.

Released 
The film was released on April 7, 2017, in 48 theatres all over the country.

On January 13, 2018, the film was exhibited in the Bangladesh Panorama category at the 2018 Dhaka International Film Festival. The film also exhibited at the Global Film Festival on August 22, 2019.

Reception

Critical reception 
Ruhul Amin of Risingbd.com writes that his "several incompatibilities were noticed" in the film, such as the rural girl spoke fluently in Dhakaiya language, and everything was in a hurry. But he praised the performance of the two lead characters.

Awards and nominations

References

External links
 
 
 
 All songs from Swatta on Bangla Movie Database (in Bengali)
 

Bengali-language Bangladeshi films
2017 films
Bangladeshi romantic drama films
2017 romantic drama films
2010s Bengali-language films